Æthelheard, King of Hwicce (an Anglo-Saxon kingdom in the English midlands) jointly with his presumed brothers Æthelweard, Æthelberht, and Æthelric. It is probable that they were all sons of Oshere, although the paternity of Æthelheard and Æthelberht is not explicitly stated in surviving documents.

In 692, together with Æthelweard, he issued a charter to Abbess Cuthswith, and also witnessed a charter of Æthelred, King of Mercia, together with Æthelweard, Æthelberht, and Æthelric. In 693 the four brothers witnessed a charter issued by their father Oshere.

The only time that he is styled rex appears to be in the possibly genuine witness list attached to a spurious charter attributed to Cenred, King of Mercia in 709.

References

External links
 

Hwiccan monarchs
8th-century English monarchs